"Jump Out the Window" is a song by American rapper Big Sean from his fourth studio album I Decided (2017). It was sent to urban contemporary radio as the third single from the album on May 2, 2017. The song was produced by Key Wane, with additional production by Hey DJ Camper. It also features uncredited vocals from singers Starrah, Jeremih and Tommy Parker. The song contains a sample of "I Fall Apart" by Julianna Gianni, from the soundtrack of the film Vanilla Sky.

Music video 
The music video was released on May 7, 2017, and was directed by Lawrence Lamont. It finds Big Sean arriving at his girl Princess's house, only to discover that she was abducted into a Super Nintendo console by a video game villain. He gets sucked into the pixelated video game world, where he fights his way through several video games before saving the Princess. When they escape the game world, they discover the villain has followed them into reality. Sean makes him disappear by unplugging the console.

Live performances 
Big Sean performed the song on MTV Movie & TV Awards. He released the music video right after his performance.

Charts

Certifications

References 

2017 singles
2017 songs
Big Sean songs
Songs written by Big Sean
Songs written by Poo Bear
Songs written by Key Wane
GOOD Music singles
Def Jam Recordings singles
Trap music songs